The Peter Courtney Minto Island Bridge is a bicycle and pedestrian Bridge in Salem, Oregon, United States.

References

Bridges in Oregon
Cyclist bridges in the United States
Pedestrian bridges in Oregon
Salem, Oregon